Q.A.M.A. Rahim is a Bangladeshi diplomat who served as the seventh secretary-general of the South Asian Association for Regional Cooperation from January 11, 2002, to February 28, 2005. He served as Bangladesh's High Commissioner to Pakistan from November 1993 to August 1998.

References

Secretaries General of the South Asian Association for Regional Cooperation
Year of birth missing (living people)
Living people
Bangladeshi diplomats
High Commissioners of Bangladesh to Pakistan